The following is a list of children of King Mindon Min. In total, Mindon Min had 45 consorts and concubines, who bore him 55 sons and 53 daughters, for a total of 108 children. Among his consorts included 4 queens of first rank (နန်းရ မိဖုရား) and 4 queens of second rank (အဆောင်ရ မိဖုရား).  

Konbaung dynasty
M
Mindon Min